"Showdown With Rance McGrew" is episode 85 of the American television anthology series The Twilight Zone.

Opening narration

Plot
Actor Rance McGrew, who stars in a TV series as the fictional heroic marshal of the same name, arrives late to shoot the final scenes of an episode in which his character pursues Jesse James. According to the script, Rance turns away from a seemingly-beaten Jesse, who then tries to shoot him in the back. The man playing Jesse says Jesse James fighting dishonorably is historically inaccurate, and asks permission to shout at Rance before firing, but Rance argues that shouting out a warning to a gunman who has already proven himself to be a better fighter makes no sense.

Suddenly, Rance finds himself in a real Old West saloon. The real Jesse James walks in and says that he, Billy the Kid, and other famous outlaws are not pleased with the way that they are portrayed on McGrew's show. Calling Rance nothing but a fraud who makes his living off the reputations of true gunslingers, Jesse challenges Rance to a fast draw showdown. Rance quickly realizes that he has no chance against a real gunfighter, but Jesse will not allow him to walk away. When the countdown finishes, Rance struggles for several seconds to get his gun out of its holster, then unintentionally flings it in the air in his panic. His point made, an amused Jesse contemptuously remarks, "Just like I figured. This guy couldn't outdraw a crayon." As Jesse aims his gun at Rance's forehead, Rance drops to his knees, pleading that he will do anything if Jesse spares him. Jesse accepts and disappears.

Rance finds himself back on the set, and his agent is announced. The agent turns out to be Jesse James himself, in Hollywood garb. He insists that the episode be revised so that instead of trying to shoot Rance in the back, Jesse James throws Rance McGrew out the saloon window and makes his escape. The scene is shot to Jesse's satisfaction. As Jesse drives Rance back home, he goes over revisions to future episodes in which Rance McGrew fights Jesse's afterlife buddies. From now on, Rance's TV series will show what those men could really do instead of just making Rance look good.

Closing narration

Cast
 Larry Blyden as Rance McGrew
 Arch Johnson as Jesse James
 Robert Cornthwaite as Director
 Robert J. Stevenson as Bartender
 William McLean as Property Man
 Troy Melton as Cowboy #1
 Jay Overholts as Cowboy #2

References
Amory, C. (1966, January 15–21). "Review: The Loner". TV Guide, p. 2
DeVoe, Bill. (2008). Trivia from The Twilight Zone. Albany, GA: Bear Manor Media. 
Grams, Martin. (2008). The Twilight Zone: Unlocking the Door to a Television Classic. Churchville, MD: OTR Publishing.

Sources
Zicree, Marc Scott. The Twilight Zone Companion, Bantam Books, 1982.

External links

See also
 Weird West
 The Loner, an adult Western created by Serling in 1965

1962 American television episodes
The Twilight Zone (1959 TV series season 3) episodes
Television episodes written by Rod Serling